This article lists major events during the 2002-03 season in Welsh football.

National team

Welsh Cup

Barry Town beat Cwmbran Town in penalties in the Welsh Cup Final. The score after extra time was 2-2.

Welsh League Cup

Rhyl beat Bangor City 4–3 in penalties in the final of the Welsh League Cup. The score after extra time was 2-2.

Welsh Premier League

Champions Barry Town
Relegated to Welsh Football League Division One : Llanelli

Welsh Football League Division One

 Champions: Bettws - did not apply for promotion to Welsh Premier League

Cymru Alliance League

 Champions: Porthmadog - promoted to Welsh Premier League

 
Seasons in Welsh football